Africolabis is a genus of earwigs in the subfamily Isolabiinae. It was cited by Steinmann in The Animal Kingdom.

References 

Anisolabididae
Dermaptera genera